Evangelical United Brethren Church (also known as Christian Church) is a historic church at 302 Fifth Street in Dayton, Oregon.

It was built in 1883 and added to the National Register of Historic Places in 1987.

References

Churches in Oregon
National Register of Historic Places in Yamhill County, Oregon
Churches completed in 1883
Buildings and structures in Dayton, Oregon
Churches on the National Register of Historic Places in Oregon
1883 establishments in Oregon
Churches in Yamhill County, Oregon
Brethren church buildings